Anthony Laron Walker Jr. (born August 8, 1995) is an American football linebacker for the Cleveland Browns of the National Football League (NFL). He played college football for Northwestern and was drafted by the Indianapolis Colts in the fifth round of the 2017 NFL Draft.

College career
Walker first saw action in his redshirt freshman season when Collin Ellis went down with a series of injuries. In his first career game, Walker returned an interception for a touchdown against Penn State that capped a Northwestern win. In his first full season as a starter, Walker found success as he recorded 122 tackles to lead the team and 20.5 tackles for loss which was fourth in the nation. For his performance that season, Walker received All-American recognition from the AP and Sports Illustrated as well as Consensus First-team All Big 10 honors. On November 29, 2016, Walker was named Second-team All-Big Ten.

Professional career

Indianapolis Colts

2017
The Indianapolis Colts selected Walker in the fifth round (161st overall) of the 2017 NFL Draft. Walker was the 20th linebacker drafted in 2017.

On May 11, 2017, the Indianapolis Colts signed Walker to a four-year, $2.66 million contract that includes a signing bonus of $265,413.

Walker missed organized team activities due to Northwestern's quarters schedule and the league's rules on rookies being unable to join their team until their school's final semester had concluded. Upon entering training camp, Walker competed to be a starting inside linebacker against Sean Spence, Antonio Morrison, Jon Bostic, and Edwin Jackson. Head coach Chuck Pagano named Walker a backup inside linebacker to begin the regular season, behind Jon Bostic and Antonio Morrison.

He made his professional regular season debut in the Indianapolis Colts' season-opener at the Los Angeles Rams, but exited in the second quarter of their 46–9 loss after sustaining a hamstring injury. His hamstring injury sidelined him for the next three games (Weeks 2–4). In Week 5, he aggravated his hamstring injury during the third quarter of a 26–23 win against the San Francisco 49ers and was inactive for the next three games (Weeks 6–8). On December 29, 2017, Walker earned his first start after Jon Bostic was ruled inactive due to an injury. He collected a season-high nine combined tackles in the Colts' 23–16 loss at the Baltimore Ravens in Week 16. On December 31, 2017, the Indianapolis Colts fired head coach Chuck Pagano after the Colts finished 4–12 in 2017. He finished his rookie season in 2017 with 22 combined tackles (11 solo) in ten games and two starts.

2018
On February 11, 2018, the Indianapolis Colts hired former Philadelphia Eagles' offensive coordinator Frank Reich as their new head coach. Defensive coordinator Matt Eberflus opted to change the base 3-4 defense and implemented a base 4-3 defense. Walker entered training camp slated as the starting middle linebacker, but saw competition from Najee Goode. On July 31, 2018, it was reported that Walker had injured his groin in the first week of training camp and was sidelined for the remainder of training camp and all four preseason games. Head coach Frank Reich named Walker the starting middle linebacker to start the regular season in 2018, alongside outside linebackers Najee Goode and rookie Shaquille Leonard.

On September 23, 2018, Walker recorded nine combined tackles and made his first career interception off a pass by Eagles' quarterback Carson Wentz during a 20–16 loss at the Philadelphia Eagles in Week 2.

2019
In Week 13 against the Tennessee Titans, Walker recorded a team high 12 tackles and forced a fumble on running back Derrick Henry on the first play of the game which was recovered by teammate Malik Hooker in the 31–17 loss.
In Week 16 against the Carolina Panthers, Walker recorded 10 tackles, sacked rookie quarterback Will Grier once, and intercepted a pass thrown by Grier during the 38–6 win.
In Week 17 against the Jacksonville Jaguars, Walker recorded a team high 16 tackles during the 38–20 loss.

2020
In Week 5 against the Cleveland Browns, Walker recorded his first interception off a pass thrown by Baker Mayfield during the 32–23 loss.
In Week 13 against the Houston Texans, Walker recovered a fumble lost by Deshaun Watson late in the fourth quarter to secure a 26–20 win for the Colts.

Cleveland Browns 
On March 19, 2021, Walker signed a one-year deal with the Cleveland Browns. Walker was placed on injured reserve with a hamstring injury on September 17, 2021. He was activated on October 9 for Week 5.

On March 16, 2022, Walker re-signed with the Browns on a one-year contract. He suffered a torn quad in Week 3 and was placed on injured reserve on September 23, 2022.

NFL career statistics

References

External links
 Anthony Walker Jr. Highlights - YouTube
 Northwestern Wildcats bio

1995 births
Living people
Monsignor Edward Pace High School alumni
Players of American football from Miami
American football linebackers
Northwestern Wildcats football players
Indianapolis Colts players
Cleveland Browns players